Progressive country is a subgenre of country music developed in the early 1970s.

Background

History
In the late 1960s and early 1970s, mainstream country music was dominated by the slick Nashville sound and the rock-influenced Bakersfield sound of artists like Merle Haggard. A new generation of country artists emerged, influenced by contemporary rock music, singer-songwriters such as Bob Dylan, and the progressive politics of the 1960s counterculture.

Progressive country was a songwriter-based movement and many key artists had previously seen success writing for other artists in Nashville; writing for themselves, they were more concerned with expanding country music than creating hits. Foremost among these artists was Willie Nelson, who returned to Texas after deciding to focus on performing his own songs. Nelson soon attained a wide following and inspired other artists in Texas and Nashville. KOKE-FM, a radio station in Austin, Texas, introduced a progressive country music format during the early 1970s and continues to feature progressive country music. Kris Kristofferson was a famous prog country musician also.

By the mid-1970s, progressive country artists entered the mainstream, usually in the form of cover versions by other artists. Progressive country also provided the basis for outlaw country, a harder-edged, more rock-oriented variant that achieved wide success in the late 1970s, as well as cowpunk and alternative country artists in the 1980s through today.

See also
Outlaw country
Progressive bluegrass
Country rock
Southern rock
Texas Country
Red Dirt (music)

References

See also
[ AllMusicGuide: Progressive country]

 
Country music genres
Country